Miles Lester Leaburn is an English professional footballer who plays as a forward for League One club Charlton Athletic.

Career
Coming through the youth system of Chelsea, Leaburn moved to Charlton Athletic in 2019 and signed his first professional contract with the club on 11 July 2022.

He made his professional debut for Charlton, aged 18, coming off the bench in a 2–2 League One draw away at Accrington Stanley on 30 July 2022 where he scored the side's second goal. In doing so, Leaburn became the third second-generation Addick to represent Charlton’s first team, following in the footsteps of his father Carl who made 344 appearances for the club between 1987 and 1998.

Personal life
Leaburn is the son of former Charlton Athletic forward Carl Leaburn.

Career statistics

References

External links
 
 

Living people
English footballers
Chelsea F.C. players
Charlton Athletic F.C. players
Association football forwards
English Football League players
2003 births